Phong may refer to:

Computer graphics 

Phong shading
Phong reflection model
Blinn–Phong shading model
Bui Tuong Phong - creator of the Phong shading interpolation method and reflection model.

Other 

Phong-Kniang language
Nam Phong (disambiguation), various meanings
Hai Phong
A character in the animated show ReBoot
A character in the Infocom text adventure The Witness